Steeve is a given name. Notable people with the name include:

Steeve Beusnard (born 1992), French footballer
Steeve Barry (born 1991), French Rugby sevens player
Steeve Briois (born 1972), French politician
Steeve Curpanen (born 1972), Mauritian footballer
Steeve-Mike Eboa Ebongue (born 2000), French footballer
Steeve Elana (born 1980), French-born Martinican footballer
Steeve Epesse-Titi (born 1979), French footballer
Steeve Estatof (born 1972), French singer-songwriter
Steeve Falgayrettes, French Guianan professional football manager
Steeve Gerard Fankà (born 1988), Cameroonian footballer
Steeve Guénot (born 1985), French wrestler
Steeve Gustan (born 1985), Martinican footballer
Steeve Ho You Fat (born 1988), French basketball player
Steeve Joseph-Reinette (born 1983), French footballer
Steeve Nguema Ndong (1971–2009), Gabonese judoka
Steeve Saint-Duc (born 2000), Haitian footballer
Steeve Theophile (born 1980), French footballer
Steeve Yago (born 1992), French-born Burkina Faso footballer

See also
Steve, given name